Mozza may refer to:
 an abbreviation for mozzarella, a type of Italian cheese
A nickname of:
 Morrissey (born 1959), English musician
 Andy Morrison (born 1970), Scottish footballer
 Adrian Morley (born 1977), English rugby footballer